Frederick Sessions Beebe (February 20, 1914 – May 1, 1973) was an American lawyer and chairman of the board of The Washington Post Company.

Early life 
Fritz Beebe was born in Utica, New York to Harry R. Beebe, a civil engineer, and Mertice Beebe. He spent most of his early years in Utica. In 1931 he matriculated at Dartmouth College graduating in 1935 and later attended Yale Law School where he received his degree in 1938. While at Yale he was selected as an editor of The Law Journal. In May 1943 he enlisted in the U.S. Navy.

Career
When The Washington Post purchased Newsweek in 1961, Beebe handled all of the details of the acquisition. After completion of the transaction Phil Graham, owner of the company, asked Beebe to accept the position of Chairman of the Board of the Washington Post Company and oversee Newsweek from New York. He accepted the offer and resigned from the law firm.

Personal life 
On July 20, 1939, he married Liane Petzl-Basny in New York City.

Death
Beebe died on May 1, 1973 at the Columbia Presbyterian Medical Center in New York City. The cause of death was intestinal cancer. He is buried in Sleepy Hollow Cemetery near Tarrytown, New York.

Accomplishments and recognition
 The Frederick Sessions Beebe '35 Professorship in the Art of Writing. Dartmouth College
 Director, member of the board of governors of the United Nations Association
 American Stock Exchange Advisory Committee
 Member of the National Industrial Conference Board
 Beebe was portrayed by actor Tracy Letts in the 2017 film The Post

References 

American publishers (people)
Burials at Sleepy Hollow Cemetery
1914 births
1973 deaths
The Washington Post people
People from Utica, New York
Dartmouth College alumni
Yale Law School alumni
American corporate directors
Lawyers from New York City